The men's tournament was won by the team representing .

Preliminary round

 Qualified for quarterfinals
 Eliminated
 Did not start
Source: Paralympic.org

Medal round

Source: Paralympic.org

Classification 5-8 

Source: Paralympic.org

Classification 9-12 

Source: Paralympic.org

Ranking

References

Men